Ann Minnick is an American nursing scholar focusing in safety and quality in hospitals and workforce and academic quality.

Minnick is currently the Julia Eleanor Chenault Professor at Vanderbilt University.

References

Year of birth missing (living people)
Living people
Vanderbilt University faculty
American nurses
American women nurses
American women academics
Place of birth missing (living people)